John Bennett Dawson (March 17, 1798 – June 26, 1845) was an American politician who served as a Democrat in the United States House of Representatives from the state of Louisiana.

Early life
Born near Nashville, Tennessee on March 17, 1798, he went to Centre College in Danville, Kentucky. He moved to Louisiana and became a planter residing at Wyoming Plantation; he was also interested in the newspaper business. He married Margaret Johnson and together they had four children. His daughter Anna Ruffin Dawson married Robert C. Wickliffe who would serve as Lieutenant Governor and Governor of Louisiana in the 1850s.

Political career
From 1823-1824, Dawson was a member of the Louisiana House of Representatives representing Feliciana Parish.
  
He unsuccessfully ran for Louisiana Governor in 1834, He was defeated by Whig candidate Edward D. White.

In 1840, Dawson was elected as a Democrat representing the Second District in the 27th Congress. He was re-elected in 1842 and represented the Third District in the 28th Congress. He served from March 4, 1841, until his death on June 26, 1845. He defeated James M. Elam (Whig) in the election of 1843.

He served as major-general in the State militia, judge of the parish court in West Feliciana Parish, and U.S. postmaster at New Orleans from April 10, 1843, until December 19, 1843.

Dawson was known for his threats of violence, particularly on the topic of slavery. He once "threatened to cut a colleague’s throat ‘from ear to ear.’" On separate occasions, he drew a Bowie knife on and raised a cocked pistol at the anti-slavery congressman Joshua R. Giddings. John Quincy Adams described him as a "drunken bully."

Death
Dawson died on June 26, 1845. His remains were interred in Grace Episcopal churchyard in St. Francisville, Louisiana. His successor in Congress, John H. Harmanson, eulogized him on the floor of the House, but not without noting his "faults — some thought grave faults."

In his memory, a cenotaph was erected at Congressional Cemetery in Washington, D.C.

See also
List of United States Congress members who died in office (1790–1899)

References

1798 births
1845 deaths
19th-century American politicians
19th-century American judges
19th-century American Episcopalians
American planters
Democratic Party members of the Louisiana House of Representatives
Centre College alumni
Democratic Party members of the United States House of Representatives from Louisiana
Politicians from Nashville, Tennessee
Louisiana state court judges